McKenzie is a city at the tripoint of Carroll, Henry, and Weakley counties in Tennessee, United States. The population was 5,310 at the 2010 census.

It is home to Bethel University and the Tennessee College of Applied Technology at McKenzie.

Geography
McKenzie is located in northern Carroll County at  (36.133189, -88.517189). A small part of the city extends north into Henry County, and a smaller part extends west into Weakley County. U.S. Route 79 passes through the city southeast of the center, leading northeast  to Paris and southwest  to Milan. Tennessee State Route 22 runs through the east side of the city as a bypass, leading northwest  to Martin and southeast  to Huntingdon.

Demographics

2020 census

As of the 2020 United States census, there were 5,529 people, 2,116 households, and 1,278 families residing in the city.

2000 census
As of the census of 2000, there were 5,295 people, 2,131 households, and 1,412 families residing in the city. The population density was 957.9 people per square mile (369.7/km2). There were 2,382 housing units at an average density of 430.9 per square mile (166.3/km2). The racial makeup of the city was 82.80% White, 14.24% African American, 0.11% Native American, 0.34% Asian, 0.02% Pacific Islander, 0.79% from other races, and 1.70% from two or more races. Hispanic or Latino of any race were 2.15% of the population.

There were 2,131 households, out of which 28.4% had children under the age of 18 living with them, 47.4% were married couples living together, 15.6% had a female householder with no husband present, and 33.7% were non-families. 29.8% of all households were made up of individuals, and 14.6% had someone living alone who was 65 years of age or older. The average household size was 2.31 and the average family size was 2.85.

In the city, the population was spread out, with 21.8% under the age of 18, 12.4% from 18 to 24, 24.2% from 25 to 44, 22.8% from 45 to 64, and 18.8% who were 65 years of age or older. The median age was 38 years. For every 100 females, there were 88.7 males. For every 100 females age 18 and over, there were 85.7 males.

The median income for a household in the city was $28,319, and the median income for a family was $34,322. Males had a median income of $26,038 versus $19,090 for females. The per capita income for the city was $18,723. About 10.4% of families and 13.4% of the population were below the poverty line, including 19.1% of those under age 18 and 9.9% of those age 65 or over.

Media

Radio
 WRQR-FM 105.5  "Today's Best Music with Ace & TJ in the Morning"
 WTPR-AM 710 "The Greatest Hits of All Time"
 WTPR-FM 101.7 "The Greatest Hits of All Time"
 WTJF AM 1390 FM 105.3 & 94.3 "The Mike Slater Show" 6am-9am
 WHDM 1440-AM 98.9-FM
 WAJJ 89.3 FM WAJJ Christian Radio

Newspapers
 The McKenzie Banner

See also

 List of cities in Tennessee

References

External links

 

Cities in Tennessee
Cities in Carroll County, Tennessee
Cities in Henry County, Tennessee
Cities in Weakley County, Tennessee